Where I Live is an American sitcom that premiered on March 5, 1993, as part of ABC's TGIF lineup. The series was created and executive produced by Michael Jacobs and Ehrich Van Lowe. Its final episode aired on November 20, 1993.

Synopsis
The series starred Doug E. Doug as Douglas St. Martin, a Trinidadian American teenager living in the Harlem section of New York City. He lived with his caring, hard-working parents and his younger sister. Much of the show focused on Douglas's misadventures with his best friends, Reggie (Flex) and Malcolm (Shaun Baker). The show was based on Doug E. Doug's own childhood.

A midseason replacement, the series drew critical acclaim for its realistic portrayals, but the show brought in low ratings compared to rest of the TGIF lineup, putting the show on the brink of cancellation. Support from fans and Bill Cosby helped the show get renewed for a second season. The show returned in the summer on Tuesdays after Full House, which raised the ratings temporarily. Bill Cosby then became a consultant on the series. However, the show was moved to Saturday nights with the debuting George as its lead-in for its second season, and the ratings were even lower than before. Eight episodes were produced for the second season, but the series was cancelled after only three of them had aired.

Cast

Main
Doug E. Doug as Douglas St. Martin
Flex Alexander as Reggie Coltrane
Shaun Baker as Malcolm Richardson
Lorraine Toussaint as Marie St. Martin
Yunoka Doyle as Sharon St. Martin
Jason Bose Smith as Kwanzie
Sullivan Walker as James St. Martin

Recurring
Almayvonne as Vonzella

Episodes

Season 1 (1993)

Season 2 (1993)

Syndication
Reruns of the series, including the unaired episodes, were broadcast on the TV One cable network in 2009.

In The Netherlands, the series was aired by RTL 4.

Awards and nominations

References

External links 
 
 

1993 American television series debuts
1993 American television series endings
American Broadcasting Company original programming
1990s American black sitcoms
1990s American sitcoms
English-language television shows
Television series by ABC Studios
Television shows set in Manhattan
TGIF (TV programming block)
Television series created by Michael Jacobs